KWOG, Virtual channel 57 (UHF digital channel 29), is a Daystar owned-and-operated television station licensed to Springdale, Arkansas, United States. The station is owned by Word of God Fellowship. KWOG's transmitter is located west of Springdale.

History
Prior to March 2, 2007, the station aired SafeTV with the callsign KSBN-TV, owned by Total Life Community Educational Foundation.

Technical information

Subchannels
The station's digital signal is multiplexed:

References

External links
 Official website

Daystar (TV network) affiliates
Television channels and stations established in 1995
Springdale, Arkansas
WOG